The American Sailing Association is the predominant standards bearer and codifier in the arena of recreational sailing education in the Americas. The organization was founded in 1983 by television producer Lenny Shabes who felt there was no recognized educational system in place to learn the sport of sailing. Today there are over 300 affiliate schools that teach the ASA methods via the many textbooks the Association creates and publishes. Over one million sailors have come through the American Sailing Association learning system.

In administering this educational structure that includes on-water and written testing, ASA certifications are now recognized at charter companies and maritime employers all around the world. They have published textbooks for beginners, coastal cruising sailors, bareboat charterers and those looking to buy or charter cruising catamarans. In addition to textbooks, ASA has produced educational videos, smart-phone apps and most recently an interactive digital game that aims to teach and drill rudimentary sailing skills while off the water.

The American Sailing Association is also an avid promoter of the sport of sailing – they are an active contributor in social media and sponsor an app called GO SAILING that enables sailors to connect anywhere they happen to be in the world.

Contributors

One of ASA's most renowned and esteemed contributors is Peter Isler who has been part of five America's Cup campaigns, authored two sailing books of his own and is known as one of the most distinguished sailors in the world.

Through the years ASA has formed bonds and partnerships with publications and manufacturers. Two of the most prominent are Cruising World Magazine and Beneteau Yachts. Cruising World is arguably sailing's most recognized publication with a large domestic and international circulation. They co-sponsored ASA's Docking Made Easy video series and other projects through the years.

Beneteau Yachts joined forces in 2010 with ASA in creating a small keelboat specifically designed for teaching. The ASA 22 is the product of Beneteau design and engineering combined with ASA's deep knowledge of efficient and safe teaching. It has an extended cockpit for group learning sessions and is equipped with roller furling, self-tailing winches and twin rudders.

Certification standards

Sail Training Courses 
ASA 101: Basic Keelboat Sailing
ASA 103: Basic Coastal Cruising
ASA 104: Bareboat Cruising
ASA 105: Coastal Navigation
ASA 106: Advanced Coastal Cruising
ASA 107: Celestial Navigation
ASA 108: Offshore Passagemaking
ASA 114: Cruising Catamaran

Endorsement Courses
ASA 117: Basic Celestial Endorsement
ASA 118: Docking Endorsement
ASA 119: Weather Endorsement
ASA 120: Radar Endorsement

Online eCourses
Your First Sail

Flotillas

The ASA sponsors sailing flotillas around the world. Frequent destinations include the Caribbean, Greece, Croatia, the San Juan Islands, and Tahiti.

External links
http://www.asa.com/
http://www.asa.com/social_media/

References

Yachting associations
Sailing in the United States